Formed in 1996 by Damien Paris, Andrew Totolos and Tim Kent, The Giraffes are an active hard rock band from New York City. In 2001 Singer Aaron Lazar joined the band and was with them till 2011, until he took a three years hiatus. In that time one record was released (Tales of the Black Whistle.)  In 2014 singer Aaron Lazar rejoined the band and released the EP Usury. The current line-up consists of singer Aaron Lazar, guitarist Damien Paris, drummer Andrew Totolos, and bassist Hannah Moorhead. Their seventh full-length album, Flower of the Cosmos, was released in 2019 by Silver Sleeve and Rough Trade. The album was recorded at Studio G in Brooklyn and produced by Tony Maimone and Francisco Botero.

Discography

Studio albums
Franksquilt (1998) Apesauce Records
Helping You Help Yourself (2002) Apesauce Records
A Gentleman Never Tells (2003) Apesauce Records
The Giraffes (2005) Razor & Tie
Pretty in Puke (2006) Apesauce Records
Prime Motivator (2008) Crustacean Records
Ruled (2011) Crustacean Records
Tales of the Black Whistle (2012) Apesauce Records
Usury (2015) Silver Sleeve
Flower of the Cosmos (2019) Silver Sleeve/Rough Trade Records

Video albums
Show (2010) Crustacean Records

Official bootlegs
Farewell, Fat Astronaut (2011) (Limited Release) Apesauce Records

References

External links
Official Web Site

Hard rock musical groups from New York (state)
Musical groups from Brooklyn